Acrocercops inconspicua is a moth of the family Gracillariidae known from Puerto Rico. It was described by William Trowbridge Merrifield Forbes in 1930. the host plant for the species is Citharaexylon fruticosum.

References

inconspicua
Moths of the Caribbean
Moths described in 1930